Lucy Eldine Gonzalez Parsons (born Lucia Carter; 1851 – March 7, 1942) was an American labor organizer, radical socialist and anarcho-communist. She is remembered as a powerful orator. Parsons entered the radical movement following her marriage to newspaper editor Albert Parsons and moved with him from Texas to Chicago, where she contributed to the newspaper he famously edited, The Alarm.

Following her husband's 1887 execution in conjunction with the Haymarket affair, Parsons remained a leading American radical activist, as a founder of the Industrial Workers of the World and member of other political organizations.

Biography

Early life 
Lucy Parsons was born Lucia Carter in Virginia in 1851. Her mother, Charlotte, was an African-American woman enslaved by a white man named Tolliver, who may have been Lucy's father. In 1863, during the Civil War, Tolliver relocated to Waco, Texas with his slaves, dodging the enforcement of the Emancipation Proclamation that set January 1, 1863 as the date all enslaved people would be free.

Little is known about her life following the move to Texas. She worked as a seamstress and a cook for white families. Parsons lived with or was married to a former slave, Oliver Gathing, for a time prior to 1870. During this relationship, she had an infant which died at birth. In 1871, she married Albert Parsons, a former Confederate soldier. They were forced to flee north from Texas in 1873 due to intolerant reactions to their interracial marriage. During the journey, Parsons altered her first name to Lucy. The couple settled in Chicago, Illinois.

Organizing 

Described by the Chicago Police Department as "more dangerous than a thousand rioters" in the 1920s, Parsons and her husband had become highly effective anarchist organizers primarily involved in the labor movement in the late 19th century, but also participating in revolutionary activism on behalf of political prisoners, people of color, the homeless and women. She began writing for The Socialist and The Alarm, the journal of the International Working People's Association (IWPA) that she and Parsons, among others, founded in 1883. Parsons worked closely with her friend and collaborator Lizzie Holmes in the early years of the 1880s, and the two of them led marches of working seamstresses in Chicago. In 1886 her husband, who had been heavily involved in campaigning for the eight-hour day, was arrested, tried, and executed on November 11, 1887, by the state of Illinois on charges that he had conspired in the Haymarket Riot — an event which was widely regarded as a political frame-up and which marked the beginning of May Day labor rallies in protest.

Parsons was invited to write for the French anarchist journal Les Temps Nouveaux and spoke alongside William Morris and Peter Kropotkin during a visit to Great Britain in 1888.

In 1892 she briefly published a periodical, Freedom: A Revolutionary Anarchist-Communist Monthly. She was often arrested for giving public speeches or distributing anarchist literature. While she continued championing the anarchist cause, she came into ideological conflict with some of her contemporaries, including Emma Goldman, over her focus on class politics over gender and sexual struggles.

In 1905 she participated in the founding of the Industrial Workers of the World (IWW), and began editing the Liberator, an anarchist newspaper that supported the IWW in Chicago. Lucy's focus shifted somewhat to class struggles around poverty and unemployment, and she organized the Chicago Hunger Demonstrations in January 1915, which pushed the American Federation of Labor, the Socialist Party, and Jane Addams' Hull House to participate in a huge demonstration on February 12. Parsons was also quoted as saying: "My conception of the strike of the future is not to strike and go out and starve, but to strike and remain in, and take possession of the necessary property of production." Parsons anticipated the sit-down strikes in the US and, later, workers' factory takeovers in Argentina.

In 1925 she began working with the National Committee of the International Labor Defense in 1927, a communist-led organization that defended labor activists and unjustly-accused African Americans such as the Scottsboro Nine and Angelo Herndon. While it is commonly accepted by nearly all biographical accounts (including those of the Lucy Parsons Center, the IWW, and Joe Knowles) that Parsons joined the Communist Party in 1939, there is some dispute, notably in Gale Ahrens' essay "Lucy Parsons: Mystery Revolutionist, More Dangerous Than A Thousand Rioters". Ahrens points out that the obituary the Communist Party had published on her death made no claim that she had been a member.

Conflict with Emma Goldman 
Emma Goldman and Lucy Parsons represented different generations of anarchism. This resulted in ideological and personal conflict. Biographer Carolyn Ashbaugh has explained their disagreements in depth:

In 1908, after Captain Mahoney (of the New York City Police Department) crashed one of Goldman's lectures in Chicago, newspaper headlines read that every popular anarchist had been present for the spectacle, "with the single exception of Lucy Parsons, with whom Emma Goldman is not on the best of terms." Goldman reciprocated Parsons's absence by endorsing Frank Harris' book The Bomb, which was a largely fictional account of the Haymarket Affair and its martyrs' road to death. (Parsons had published The Famous Speeches of the Haymarket Martyrs, a non-fictional, first-hand recounting of the Haymarket martyrs' final speeches in court.)

Parsons was solely dedicated to working class liberation, condemning Goldman for "addressing large middle-class audiences"; Goldman accused Parsons of riding upon the cape of her husband's martyrdom. "[N]o doubt," Candace Falk wrote (Love, Anarchy, and Emma Goldman), "there was an undercurrent of competitiveness between the two women. Emma generally preferred center stage." Goldman planned on preserving her place in the spotlight as an American anarchist laureate by shoving risqué sexual and kinship discourse into "the center of a perennial debate among anarchists about the relative importance of such personal issues".

In The Firebrand, Parsons wrote, "Mr. [Oscar] Rotter [a free love advocate] attempts to dig up the hideous 'Variety' grub and bind it to the beautiful unfolding blossom of labor's emancipation from wage-slavery and call them one and the same. Variety in sex relations and economic freedom have nothing in common." Goldman responded: 

Parsons responded: "The line will be drawn sharply at personalities as we know these enlighten no one and do infinitely more harm than good."

Goldman, in her autobiography, Living My Life, briefly mentioned the presence of "Mrs. Lucy Parsons, widow of our martyred Albert Parsons", at a Chicago labor convention, noting that she "took an active part in the proceedings". Goldman later would acknowledge Albert Parsons for becoming a socialist and anarchist, proceeding to praise him for having "married a young mulatto"; there was no further mention of Lucy Parsons.

Death 

Parsons continued to give fiery speeches in Chicago's Bughouse Square into her 80s, where she inspired Studs Terkel. One of her last major appearances was a speech to striking workers at International Harvester (the successor to the McCormick Harvesting Machine Company, whose striking workers played a role in the Haymarket Affair) in February 1941.

Parsons died on March 7, 1942, in a house fire in the Avondale Community Area of Chicago. Her lover, George Markstall, died the next day from injuries he received while trying to save her. She was approximately 91 years old. After her death, police seized her library of over 1,500 books. She is buried near her husband at Waldheim Cemetery (now Forest Home Cemetery), near the Haymarket Martyrs' Monument in Forest Park, Illinois.

Origins and ethnicity 
Parsons refused to speak about her private life or origins. When asked for details about her history, she declared "I am not a candidate for office, and the public have no right to my past. I amount to nothing to the world and people care nothing of me. I am battling for a principle." This stance has made research into her origins difficult for historians.

Parsons specifically denied that she was a child of a former slave of African descent, claiming that she was born in Texas and her parents were Mexican and Native American. She described herself as a “Spanish-Indian maiden” to explain her dark complexion. These personal myths persisted after her death: on her death certificate, her parents' names were listed as Pedro Díaz and Marites González, both born in Mexico.

Legacy, tributes and memorials 

The Lucy Parsons Center was founded in 1970 in Boston, Massachusetts. It continues as a collectively-run radical bookstore and infoshop.

In the 1990s, a local Chicago artist installed a memorial to Parsons in Wicker Park.

In 2004, the city of Chicago named a park for Parsons.

On July 16, 2007, a book that purportedly belonged to Lucy Parsons was featured on a segment of the PBS television series, History Detectives. During the segment it was determined that the book, which was a biography of Albert Parsons' co-defendant August Spies' life and trial, was most likely a copy published and sold by Parsons as a means of raising money to prevent her husband's execution. The segment also provided background on Parsons' life and the Haymarket Affair.

On October 15, 2015, a copy of William Morris's Signs of Change: Seven Lectures Delivered on Various Occasions was sold at auction in England. It was inscribed "To Lucy E Parsons from William Morris November 15, 1888", bore a "Property of Federal Bureau of Investigation US Department of Justice" stamp, and a "Surplus Library of Congress Duplicate" stamp; some of its pages showed traces of smoke damage.

In 2016, The Nation magazine released free and online a short film by animator Kelly Gallagher about Lucy Parsons, "More Dangerous Than a Thousand Rioters: The Revolutionary Life of Lucy Parsons."

The organization Lucy Parsons Labs is a Chicago-based organization focused on digital rights and on-the-streets activism. In 2016 the organization released documents tracking the Chicago Police Department's use of cell-site simulators that connect to passer-by cellphones and store data for potential law enforcement use.

In 2022, a new housing development with 100% affordable units was named after Lucy Gonzalez Parsons. The apartments are located 6 blocks from the Avondale, Chicago home where she spent her final years. The apartments provide affordable housing in the Logan Square neighborhood, where gentrification and rapidly-rising rents are common.

References

Works 
 "A Word to Tramps," The Alarm, vol. 1, no. 1 (October 4, 1884), p. 1.
 "An Interview With Lucy Parsons on the Prospects for Anarchism in America," St. Louis Post-Dispatch, vol. 37, no. 95 (October 21, 1886), p. 4.
 "Life of Albert R. Parsons, with brief history of the labor movement in America" (1889)

Further reading 
 Carolyn Ashbaugh, Lucy Parsons: American Revolutionary. Chicago: Charles H. Kerr Publishing Co., 1976.
 Paul Avrich, The Haymarket Tragedy. Princeton, NJ: Princeton University Press, 1984.
 Jacqueline Jones, Goddess of Anarchy: The Life and Times of Lucy Parsons, American Radical. New York: Basic Books, 2017.
 Dave Roediger and Franklin Rosemont (eds.), A Haymarket Scrapbook. Chicago: Charles H. Kerr Publishing Co., 1986.
 Keith Rosenthal, "Lucy Parsons: 'More Dangerous Than a Thousand Rioters'", Joan of Mark, September 6, 2011.
 "Lucy Parsons Is Burned to Death in Chicago; Husband Was Hanged After Haymarket Riot", the New York Times, March 8, 1942, p. 36.

External links 

 The Lucy Parsons Center, a radical bookstore in Boston, Massachusetts

 

Carolyn Ashbaugh Research Papers at the Newberry Library
Lucy Parsons Labs, a Chicago-based digital rights organization

1850s births
1942 deaths
20th-century American women writers
Accidental deaths in Illinois
Activists from Chicago
African-American anarchists
African-American communists
African-American trade unionists
American anti-capitalists
American anti-fascists
American women journalists
Anarcha-feminists
Anarcho-communists
Burials at Forest Home Cemetery, Chicago
Communist women writers
Deaths from fire in the United States
Industrial Workers of the World leaders
Industrial Workers of the World members
American trade union leaders
People from Chicago
Year of birth uncertain
American revolutionaries
American communists
Members of the Communist Party USA